Piz dal Teo is a mountain in the Livigno Alps, located on the border between Italy and Switzerland. It lies south of Scima da Saoseo.

References

External links
 Piz dal Teo on Hikr

Teo
Teo
Teo
Teo
Italy–Switzerland border
International mountains of Europe
Mountains of Graubünden